Didolodus is an extinct genus of mammals from Middle Eocene Argentina. It is an ungulate mammal of uncertain affinities, possibly related to Litopterna, though this is uncertain due to the lack of reliable post-cranial remains, and for now remains Meridiungulata incertae sedis. Its remains were found in the Sarmiento Formation of Patagonia.

Didolodus probably was a quick-footed creature which probably lived like early ungulates such as Propalaeotherium, based on its highly similar teeth.

Phylogeny 
Cladogram after Gelfo and Sigé, 2011:

References 

Didolodontids
Eocene mammals of South America
Divisaderan
Paleogene Argentina
Fossils of Argentina
Fossil taxa described in 1897
Taxa named by Florentino Ameghino
Prehistoric placental genera
Golfo San Jorge Basin
Sarmiento Formation